Tweede Divisie is the highest amateur (and historically the lowest professional) football league in the Netherlands. It was established in 1956, together with the Eredivisie and the Eerste Divisie. Between 1956 and 1960 and between 1962 and 1966, the league consisted of two divisions, Tweede Divisie A and Tweede Divisie B. The league was disbanded in 1971. Six clubs were promoted to the Eerste Divisie (De Volewijckers, FC Eindhoven, FC VVV, Fortuna Vlaardingen, PEC and Roda JC), while the other eleven teams became amateur clubs.

Plans for a new, amateur Tweede Divisie, to be made up of 4 reserve teams and 14 Topklasse clubs, were approved in a KNVB assembly in December 2014. Thus, the Topklasse, renamed the Derde Divisie, and leagues below decremented by one level, and furthermore, promotion and relegation among the second to fourth divisions were implemented starting in 2016–17. Despite its amateurism, the league obligates its clubs to have a minimum number of players under contract. No first team will be promoted to the Eerste Divisie until after 2022–23, but from the end of 2020–21 at first, the highest-ranked second (i.e., reserve) team gains promotion, while the lowest-ranked reserves are relegated to a new under-21 division. An under-23 competition has been established for the Tweede Divisie's amateur clubs that are not directly eligible for its under-21 equivalent. Because of the 2020–21 season's cancellation, promotion or relegation is likely to be deferred to the end of 2021–22.

Champions
 1956–57: Leeuwarden & RBC
 1957–58: ZFC & Heracles
 1958–59: 't Gooi & Go Ahead
 1959–60: EDO & Be Quick
 1960–61: HFC Haarlem
 1961–62: Velox
 1962–63: VSV (beat HFC Haarlem in a play-off)
 1963–64: NEC (beat Alkmaar '54 in a play-off)
 1964–65: SC Cambuur (beat DFC in a play-off)
 1965–66: Vitesse Arnhem & FC Den Bosch
 1966–67: HFC Haarlem
 1967–68: FC Wageningen
 1968–69: De Graafschap
 1969–70: SC Heerenveen
 1970–71: Volewijckers
 2016–17: Jong AZ
 2017–18: Katwijk
 2018–19: AFC
 2019–20: No champions
 2020–21: No champions
 2021–22: Katwijk

2021–22 teams

References

External links
RSSSF - info on all seasons

 
3
Sports leagues established in 1956
1956 establishments in the Netherlands
Amateur association football
Neth